Ram Chandra Yadav (born 1968) is a Bharatiya Janata Party politician and a member of the Uttar Pradesh Legislative Assembly from Rudauli. He was arrested by the Uttar Pradesh police on 25 August 2013 during the Vishwa Hindu Parishad's Chaurasi Kos Padayatra.

References

Bharatiya Janata Party politicians from Uttar Pradesh
Living people
People from Faizabad district
Indian Hindus
Uttar Pradesh MLAs 2012–2017
Uttar Pradesh MLAs 2017–2022
1961 births
Uttar Pradesh MLAs 2022–2027